Exocoetus is a genus of flying fishes. 
It is a bony fish.
The body is covered with cycloid scales.
The mouth is wide, and the jaws bear teeth.
It is a marine fish.
The tail has hypobatic fins as the ventral lobe.

Species
Five species in this genus are recognized:
 Exocoetus gibbosus Parin & Shakhovskoy, 2000 (oceanic flyingfish)
 Exocoetus monocirrhus J. Richardson, 1846 (barbel flyingfish)
 Exocoetus obtusirostris Günther, 1866 (oceanic two-wing flyingfish)
 Exocoetus peruvianus Parin & Shakhovskoy, 2000 (Peruvian flyingfish)
 Exocoetus volitans Linnaeus, 1758 (tropical two-wing flyingfish)

References

 
Exocoetidae
Taxa named by Carl Linnaeus